Percy James Brebner (March 24, 1864 – July 31, 1922) was a British author of adventure and detective fiction. He was the eldest son of James Brebner, manager of the National Provincial Bank of England, Piccadilly.
He was educated at King's College School and worked in the Share & Loan Department of the Stock Exchange before he began his writing career. He published his early novels under the name Christian Lys. Brebner wrote several historical novels. One of his most popular creations was professor Christopher Quarles, a master detective of the Sherlock Holmes variety. His Lost World title The Fortress of Yadasara also known as The Knight of the Silver Star was described as "a highly romantic lost-race adventure in the mode of the contemporary historical novel.". It was serialized in Italian and Spanish pulp adventure journals in the early 20th century and was listed in 333: A Bibliography of the Science-Fantasy Novel a collection of the best efforts in Science-Fantasy up to and including 1950.

Brebner also wrote for various British and American newspapers and magazines including the Weekly Tale Teller and The Sunday Star and publications like The Ilfracombe Chronicle War Supplement during the First World War.

Works
Suspicion (as Christian Lys), 1889
A London Cobweb (as Christian Lys), 1892
The Doctor's Idol (as Christian Lys), 1894
The Dunthorpes of Westleigh (as Christian Lys), 1896
The Hepsworth Millions (as Christian Lys), 1898
The Fortress Of Yadasara (as Christian Lys), 1899
The Black Card (as Christian Lys) 1899
The Mystery of Ladyplace (as Christian Lys), 1900
The Crucible Of Circumstance, 1906
Princess Maritza, 1906
The Knight Of The Silver Star, 1907 (American edition of The Fortress Of Yadasara, published under the name Percy Brebner)
Vayenne, 1908
A Royal Ward, 1909 Novel set during the Regency era
The Testing of Olive Vaughan, 1909
A Gentleman of Virginia, 1910 Novel set during the French Revolution and featuring as Lafayette a character 
The Brown Mask, 1910 Novel about Monmouth's Rebellion
The Light That Lures, 1911
The White Gauntlet, 1912 Novel about the First Duke of Marlborough and Queen Anne
The Little Gray Schoe, 1913
Christopher Quarles, 1914
The Turbulent Duchess, 1915
The Master Detective, 1916
A Gallant Lady, 1919
The Ivory Disc, 1920
The Gate of Temptation, 1920

References

External links
 Percy James Brebner at the Encyclopedia of Science Fiction.
 
 

1864 births
1922 deaths
British writers
English male novelists
English science fiction writers
English historical novelists
Writers of historical fiction set in the early modern period
Writers of historical fiction set in the modern age